A bucket is typically a watertight, vertical cylinder or truncated cone or square, with an open top and a flat bottom, attached to a semicircular carrying handle called the bail.

A bucket is usually an open-top container. In contrast, a pail can have a top or lid and is a shipping container. In common usage, the two terms are often used interchangeably.

Types and uses
A number of bucket types exist, used for a variety of purposes. Though most of these are functional purposes, a number, including those constructed from precious metals, are used for ceremonial purposes. Common types of bucket and their adjoining purposes include:

 Water buckets used to carry water
 Household and garden buckets used for carrying liquids and granular products
 Elaborate ceremonial or ritual buckets constructed of bronze, ivory or other materials, found in several ancient or medieval cultures, sometimes known by the Latin for bucket, 
 Large scoops or buckets attached to loaders and telehandlers for landscaping agricultural and purposes
 Crusher buckets attached to excavators used for crushing and recycling material in the construction industry
 Buckets shaped like castles often used as children's toys to shape and carry sand on a beach or in a sandpit
 Buckets in special shapes such as cast iron buckets or smelting buckets to hold liquid metal at high temperatures.

Though not always bucket shaped, lunch boxes are sometimes known as lunch pails or a lunch bucket. Buckets can be repurposed as seats, tool caddies, hydroponic gardens, chamber pots, "street" drums, or livestock feeders, amongst other uses. Buckets are also repurposed for the use of long term food storage by survivalists.

Shipping containers

When in reference to a shipping container, the term "pail" is used as a technical term, specifically referring to a bucket shaped package with a sealed top or lid, which is then used as a transport container for chemicals and industrial products.

Gallery

English language phrases and idioms
The bucket has been used in many phrases and idioms in the English language, some of which are regional or specific to the use of English in different English-speaking countries.

 Kick the bucket: an informal term referring to someone's death
 Drop the bucket on: to implicate a person in something (from Australian slang)
 A drop in the bucket: a small, inadequate amount in relation to how much is requested or asked, taken from the biblical Book of Isaiah, chapter 40, verse 15
 Bucket list: a list of activities an individual wishes to undertake before death

Unit of measurement

See also
 Bobrinski Bucket
 Coal scuttle
 Mop
 Pail (container)
 There's a Hole in My Bucket
 Veronica Bucket

References

External links

 "Five-gallon farm collectibles" by Jennifer M. Latzke
 "Uses for Five Gallon Buckets
 U.S. Consumer Product Safety Commission warning
 

Containers
Food packaging
Domestic implements